Weeville is an album by New Zealand band Tall Dwarfs, released in 1990. It was the band's first album, after almost a decade of EP-only releases.

The album was reissued, along with Fork Songs, in 2005 by Cloud Recordings. The band toured the United States to promote the reissue.

Production
The album was made possible by a grant from the New Zealand Arts Council.

Critical reception

Trouser Press called the album "unpretentious but insidiously great." Exclaim! wrote that "the songs that endure are acoustically strummed with simple arrangements." The Chicago Tribune labeled it "a Sgt. Pepper of low-tech innovation." Philadelphia Weekly noted that "Weeville also underscores just how profoundly the Kiwi scene affected America's Elephant 6 collective, which took that affinity for pretty/ugly experimentation to dizzying heights." The Winnipeg Sun deemed the band "lo-fi psych-pop pioneers."

Track listing
"Lag"
"What More"
"Breath"
"Skin of My Teeth"
"Crawl"
"Sign the Dotted Line"
"Pirouette"
"Lucky"
"Bodies"
"Mr. Broccoli"
"Lie"
"The Winner"
"Rorschach"
"Tip of My Tongue"
"Ozone"
"Hallelujah Boy"

References

Tall Dwarfs albums
1990 albums
Flying Nun Records albums